Oleksandr Yuriyovych Sukharov (born 18 February 1994) is a Ukrainian professional footballer who plays as a right-back for Ukrainian club Kramatorsk.

References

External links
 
 
 

1994 births
Living people
People from Druzhkivka
Ukrainian footballers
Ukraine youth international footballers
Association football defenders
FC Shakhtar-3 Donetsk players
FC Zorya Luhansk players
JK Sillamäe Kalev players
Paide Linnameeskond players
FC Kramatorsk players
Ukrainian First League players
Ukrainian Second League players
Meistriliiga players
Esiliiga B players
Ukrainian expatriate footballers
Expatriate footballers in Estonia
Ukrainian expatriate sportspeople in Estonia
Sportspeople from Donetsk Oblast